Eupithecia problematicata is a moth in the family Geometridae. It is found in Iran.

References

Moths described in 1960
problematicata
Moths of the Middle East